Harinie Jeevitha (born 16 January 1995) is an Indian classical dancer and choreographer. The disciple of Smt Sheela Unnikrishnan of Sridevi Nrithyalaya, she started dancing at the young age of six in the Melattur style of Bharathanatyam (Bharatanatyam).

Critics and connoisseurs have applauded her for bringing depth, passion and spontaneity into her work. Harinie Jeevitha is a dancer conferred with Bal Shree title from National BalBhavan, 2009. She performed her Arangetram in 2006.  She has performed in major festivals in India and has also displayed her talent in many cultural capitals of the world.

She has also written a book, “Perspectives,” illustrated by Meghna Unnikrishnan.

Awards & choreographies 

 Was awarded the Balashree title from National BalBhavan, 2010
 Won the Excellency Award by the VDS Arts Academy
 Received Ranjani Rajan Award as the Best Dancer
 Got the 1st prize at the Classical Duo (with Archana Raja) and the 2nd at the Classical Solo dance contests of Akhil Bharatiya Sanskrutik Sangh (Pune, 2009)
 Got the 1st prize in the final round of Konjum Salangai dance competition series by Doordarshan TV (Podigai), 2008
 Won the 1st prize (Feb 2008) and 2nd prize (2009) in the all-India level (mixed age group) Bharatanatyam * competition in Hyderabad organized by Navya Nataka Samiti
 Won the 1st prize in the all-India level Bharatanatyam competition in Bangalore (2008) conducted by Gopinath Das Nyasa
 Won the 1st prize in Thaka-Dhimi-Tha, a dance competition show conducted by Jaya TV
 Won the 1st prize in Bharathanatyam dance contest conducted by Sivan Arts Academy (2005)
 Won the 1st prize in the junior category at the Bharatanatyam contest by Concern India in 2009
 Won the Best Bharatanatyam Dancer 2007 Award in the Junior Category from the Auroville Cultural Exchange
 Prize from Kanaka Sabha (Mumbai) in all-India Level Competition
 Prizes in Jawahar Bala Bhawan (Tamil Nadu) state- and Chennai district- level competitions
 1st prize in the Jaya Vidya Learning Centre's Bharata natyam contest
 Received the YGP Golden Jubilee Award as the "Best Actor" is also a recipient of the Bharat Kalachar scholarships for dance for 2004 - 2010

References

Sources
The Hindu
Times of India
Bharatanatyam
Narthaki

External links 
 YouTube

Indian female classical dancers
Artists from Chennai
Living people
Indian women choreographers
Indian choreographers
Performers of Indian classical dance
1995 births
Dancers from Tamil Nadu
Women artists from Tamil Nadu
21st-century Indian dancers
21st-century Indian women artists